Sauries are fish of the family Scomberesocidae.  There are two genera, each containing two species. The name Scomberesocidae is derived from the scomber, which in turn is derived from the Greek skombros, meaning "mackerel", and the Latin esox meaning pike.

Sauries are marine epipelagic fish which live in tropical and temperate waters. These fish often jump while swimming near the surface, skimming the water, which is similar to flying fish, a fellow member of the order beloniformes. The jaws of sauries are beak-like, ranging from long, slender beaks to relatively short ones with the lower jaw only slightly elongated. The mouth openings of sauries, however, are small and the jaws have weak teeth. The most distinctive feature of sauries, however, is the presence of a row of small finlets behind the dorsal and anal fins. They also lack swim bladders.

They are harvested commercially as a food fish; Pacific saury are consumed often in Japanese and Korean cuisine. The fish is usually grilled.

The Saury, a Sargo-class submarine, was the only ship of the United States Navy to be named for this fish.

Genera
There are two recognised genera within the family Scomberesocidae:

Cololabis Gill, 1896
Scomberesox Lacepède, 1803

See also
Beloniformes

References

 

 
Beloniformes
Ray-finned fish families